Ray Decker, known professionally as Kastra, is an American DJ, music producer and songwriter from New Jersey. He is known for his singles "Fool For You", "U & Me" and "Wassup (Listen to the Horns)". He is also known for his official remixes of Ava Max and 3LAU, Sultan + Shepard, and Two Friends.

Early life 
Ray Decker was born in Neptune, New Jersey. He attended Quinnipiac University where he received his Bachelor's in marketing as well as his MBA. Growing up, he played the electric guitar in various local bands, and was influenced by the hard rock and heavy metal scene. In an interview with Salacious Sound, he credited those early years as an important part of his sound and development. During a trip to Australia while in college, he was exposed to electronic music and nightclub culture. Upon returning, he began focusing on electronic music production rather than playing guitar, because it allowed him to "make an entire song by [himself]".

Musical career

2011–2014: Career beginnings 
Ray Decker began producing mashups and bootleg remixes under the name Kastra in 2011. Many of his early mashups charted in the top 5 on Hype Machine. and were also uploaded to popular YouTube channels such as Proximity. Kastra's first original releases were in 2012 when he released "Hold A Light" and "Warning" on Antiblaze Records. In 2014, he released the single "Dolla Bilz" on the Disco Fries' Liftoff Recordings.

2015–2016: Singles 
In 2015, Electric Family named Kastra one of the "10 Most Underrated Acts You Need To Know for 2015". He released a string of Melbourne bounce tracks beginning with "Placebo" on Hussle Recordings as well as "Twilight Zone" featuring Fatman Scoop. "Placebo" was included in Ministry of Sound Australia 2015 Clubbers Guide compilation. That year, he collaborated with DJ BL3ND on "Boomshakalaka".

2017–present: Style changes and international prominence 
In 2017, Kastra started to transition to more of a commercial sound and began incorporating more future house and progressive house elements into his music. He released "Feel Alright" with Buzzmeisters on Bourne Recordings, as well as "About Us" with Landis on Aftercluv Dance Lab. The following year he released numerous tracks including "Fool Me Twice", and "Supreme" which was praised by Karlie Powell ofYourEDM for its balance of "softer tones" and layered melodies.

Kastra collaborated with Timmy Trumpet and Chuck Roberts on the song "Wassup (Listen to the Horns)", released by TMRW Music on January 11, 2019. Kat Bein of Billboard praised the song's production and disco-house influences, calling it "a tropical-flavored explosion, a refreshing vacation for your ears". The song reached No. 1 on Radio Metro in Australia.

In June 2019, Kastra and Andy Tongren collaborated with Lena Leon on her debut single "Walls". Later that year, he released "U & Me", a collaboration with twoDB and Evangelia on Strange Fruit Records. The song charted at No. 8 on Billboard's Dance/Mix Show Airplay, making it Kastra's first Top 10 single.

He released "Issues", a collaboration with Modern Machines and Bianca Linta, in November 2019. The song was released on Tiësto’s Musical Freedom/AFTR:HRS label and was met with praise from DJ Times, and Dancing Astronaut. Kastra's remix of "All Your Love" by Bonka peaked at No. 5 on the ARIA Charts in 2020.

In February 2020, Kastra released the single "Around Me" with Blue Ivy and RUNAGROUND on Tritonal's Enhanced Music. He also launched his monthly radio show Niteshift Radio.

He produced the official remix for Ava Max's single "My Head & My Heart", released on November 19, 2020.

Kastra's cover of Fergie's "Glamorous" reached No. 16 on the Billboard's Dance/Mix Show charts in December 2020, making it his second Top 20 single in the US.

In late 2020, Kastra signed with Ultra Music and in early 2021 released his label debut, "Fool For You". The single reached No. 24 on the Dance/Mix Show Airplay charts.

Discography

Singles

Remixes

References

External links 
Official website

American record producers
Musicians from New Jersey
Living people
Year of birth missing (living people)
People from Asbury Park, New Jersey